Iressa is a genus of cosmet moths (family Cosmopterigidae). It belongs to subfamily Cosmopteriginae.

They are characterized mainly by their wing venation: in the forewings, vein 1b is not forked and veins 2-4 are separate, while veins 6-8 are not; veins 6 and 7 are stalked and arise from vein 8. In addition, the scape is short and bears a comb.

This genus contains only 3 known species:
 Iressa microsema J.F.G.Clarke, 1986
 Iressa neoleuca J.F.G.Clarke, 1971
 Iressa triformis (Meyrick 1927)

Footnotes

References
  (1986): Pyralidae and Microlepidoptera of the Marquesas Archipelago. Smithsonian Contributions to Zoology 416: 1-485. PDF fulltext  (214 MB!)

Cosmopteriginae
Moth genera